Anna Krzemińska-Karbowiak (born 1 June 1950) is a Polish rower. She competed in the women's coxless pair event at the 1976 Summer Olympics.

References

External links
 

1950 births
Living people
Polish female rowers
Olympic rowers of Poland
Rowers at the 1976 Summer Olympics
People from Grójec
Sportspeople from Masovian Voivodeship